Bergensk or Bergen dialect is a dialect of Norwegian used in Bergen, Norway. It is easy for Norwegians to recognise, as it is more distinguishable from other dialects in Vestland than, for example, the Stavanger dialect (Stavangersk) from the dialects of Rogaland, and the Trondheim dialect from Trøndelag dialects.

Early influence from Low German and Danish 
Many Low German and German words found their way to Norwegian through the Bergen dialect, which makes up almost 35% of the basic Norwegian vocabulary. The long history of multi-lingual coexistence in Bergen has made the dialect more susceptible to simplifications, in order to ease communication, and the influence of Danish and Low German are apparent in the modern Bergen dialect's phonetics.

Bergen's strong foreign influence, such as Hanseatic League merchants in the period from about 1350 to 1750, had a profound effect on the Bergen dialect. The Hanseatic merchants spoke varieties of Low German, and perhaps a pidgin in dealings with the locals. Bergen was the only major Norwegian city during the Dano-Norwegian union from 1536 to 1814, and the  Bergen dialect absorbed more of language trends from abroad, such as from Danish, than other Norwegian dialects. The written standard of the time, was based on the Copenhagen dialect of the Danish language, and it continued to affect Bergensk well into the 20th century. A Dano-Norwegian koiné, resembling the non-standard Riksmål, is still spoken, although in recent decades has become much more similar to Bokmål.

Gender 
Bergensk is one of two dialects in Norway with only two grammatical genders, the other being the dialect spoken in Lyngen. All others have three (excepting sociolects in other Norwegian urban areas). The feminine gender disappeared in the 16th century. One theory is that this was partly fueled by an influence from Danish, which became the written language and already had abolished the distinction between masculine and feminine forms, and as a simplification to ease communication between Norwegians and Germans or between people from Bergen and other parts of Norway.

The Old Norse -n ending was retained in the Bergen (Old Norse hon > hon), but lost elsewhere (hon > ho). The -nn ending was simplified to -n everywhere. Since the feminine definite articles were -in and -an in Old Norse, while the masculine ending was -inn, another theory is that the retention of -n, combined with an earlier reduction of unstressed vowels, caused the masculine and feminine genders to merge. In other dialects, -in and -an lost the final -n, underwent nasalization and developed into -a in a majority of the modern Norwegian dialects (other variants include -e, -i and -o) whereas -inn developed into -en.

Definite form of given names 
In Norwegian, common nouns may be indefinite or definite, while proper nouns are always indefinite. In the Bergen dialect, however, proper nouns of persons' given names are often definite, giving a less formal tone. For example, Kåre Willoch may be called Kåren (or Kåre'n, no written convention exists) or Willochen in Bergensk, whereas this would be considered incorrect elsewhere in Norway, excepting only some rural dialects in the proximity of Bergen. The reason for this emerging in Bergen is thought to be that titles, which are common nouns, were more or less used the same way as names, since in Bergen, formerly Norway's megapolis, there were many people with the same given names, but a wide range of titles. For example, "Alexander Skomaker" (in English "Alexander Shoemaker"). As titles gradually were perceived as names, and could be in the definite form (as they were common nouns), after some time, by assimilation to the titles as names, surnames and eventually given names were also used in the definite form.

Phonology 
The  phoneme is realized uvularly, either as a trill  or a fricative . The latter is the normal French pronunciation. It probably spread to Bergen (and Kristiansand) some time in the 18th century, overtaking the alveolar trill  in the time span of about 2-3 generations. Until recent decades' developments in neighboring rural dialects, this was an easy way of distinguishing them from the Bergen dialect. Nowadays, the uvular  is a feature of a much larger area of the southwestern Norway than Bergen. Broader speakers may realize the coda  as a central vowel , but that is stigmatized.
  are alveolar .

Recent developments 
In the 19th and 20th centuries, the literacy rate improved, which gave a strong influence from Riksmål, and later Bokmål. Nynorsk, Norway's other written language, was considered rural and thus lacking prestige, and has not had a strong influence on the dialect. Subsequently, large parts of the German-inspired vocabulary unique for Bergen disappeared. Plural endings are used less frequently, for example huser (houses) has become hus, which is correct Bokmål. Also, pronunciations have shifted slightly towards standard East Norwegian (Standard Østnorsk), probably as a result of the shift of power towards Oslo. For example, "pære" (pear), which was formerly pronounced as péræ, is now pronounced pæræ.

Modern Bergensk compared to Bokmål and Nynorsk 
Like almost all Norwegian dialects, Bergensk cannot be said to be either Bokmål or Nynorsk. While the vocabulary shows traits of both Bokmål and Nynorsk, it has characteristics that are not covered by any of these written standards. Also, Bokmål is often associated with Eastern Norwegian Standard Østnorsk pronunciation—although no official affiliation exists. This gives the claim that oral Bergensk "is" partly Bokmål ambiguities.
Although Nynorsk (Neo-Norwegian) has its stronghold in western Norway and the areas surrounding Bergen, most of the inhabitants of Bergen itself write Bokmål.

English verbs 
When English verbs are used as substitute for Norwegian verbs, in the past tense they are given an -et ending, like walket and drivet. This is different from the other Norwegian dialects, most of which use an -a ending.

See also 
 Bergen
 Danish dialects
 Danish language
 Norwegian dialects
 Norwegian language

References

Bibliography

Other sources

Related reading
 Fintoft, Knut  (1970), Acoustical Analysis and Perception of Tonemes in Some Norwegian Dialects (Universitetsforl)
 Haugen, Einar Ingvald (1948), Norwegian dialect studies since 1930 (University of Illinois)
 Husby, Olaf  (2008), An Introduction to Norwegian Dialects (Tapir Academic Press)

External links 
 Sound sample of (Toten) and Bergen dialect (Youtube)

Culture in Bergen
Norwegian dialects
City colloquials